Nowa Wieś Prudnicka  is a village in the administrative district of Gmina Biała, within Prudnik County, Opole Voivodeship, in southern Poland.

The village was established in 1300.

References

Villages in Prudnik County
13th-century establishments in Poland
Populated places established in the 1300s